Garima Jain is an Indian actress, trained singer & Kathak dancer. Working in and known for her roles in primarily television shows, she was featured in Guinness Book of World Records in 2009 for attempting 1000 rounds in 9 minutes 2 seconds.

Apart from television shows, Jain has also appeared in several adult and erotic web series including Gandii Baat, XXX and Twisted. In 2019, she portrayed a reporter in the commercially successful crime thriller film Mardaani 2.

Personal life 
Jain was born in Indore, and her mother name is Archana Jain. Her brother Dhairya Jain is an entrepreneur.

Jain was earlier in relationship with Vivian Dsena for few months in 2018. In 2019, she was engaged to  Raahul Sarraf, a diamond merchant. But later the marriage was called off.

Career

Television

During the beginning period of her career Jain signed consecutively episodic roles in Gudgudee as Pinky, Balika Vadhu as Ananya, Rehna Hai Teri Palkon Ki Chhaon Mein as Rashmi, Devon Ke Dev...Mahadev as Urmila, Mrs. Kaushik Ki Paanch Bahuein as Shreya and Madhubala — Ek Ishq Ek Junoon as Garima. After playing the supporting part of Julie Chaturvedi in Aaj Ki Housewife Hai...Sab Jaanti Hai (2012–13), she appeared as herself in episodic of MTV Timeout with Imam and Love Dosti Dua.

From 2013 to 2014, Jain simultaneously acted in two television shows: the mythological show Mahabharat and psychological thriller Main Naa Bhoolungi. She played Dushala in the former and Arya Jagannath in the latter. In 2015 she featured in three television serials: Yeh Hai Mohabbatein, Hello Pratibha and 2025 Jaane Kya Hoga Aage. She began 2016 via a special cameo in Kavach...Kaali Shaktiyon Se.

In June 2016, Jain joined the social transgender based series Shakti - Astitva Ke Ehsaas Ki as Raavi Singh and was praised for her performance. However, she quit the show in March 2018 and was replaced by Pooja Singh. Next she portrayed the important character of Nisha in supernatural show Tantra as well as episodic roles in Vikram Betaal Ki Rahasya Gatha, Navrangi Re! and Shrimad Bhagwat Mahapuran.

Films

Jain made her debut into Hindi cinema with Hivade Me Fute Laadu (2016) and then played a reporter in the critically acclaimed as well as commercially successful crime thriller film Mardaani 2 (2019). Her 2021 only film release is Aafat-e-Ishq.

Web series

Jain entered digital world in 2020 with Ekta Kapoor's erotic romance web series Gandii Baat on ALT Balaji, in which her role was of Kamlesh. In ALT Balaji's another erotic web series XXX 2 the same year, she starred as the sensible and smart Kavya who is unhappy with her marriage. Her next digital project was Vikram Bhatt's web series Twisted 3 which saw her portray Jiya Mehta onscreen. She also agreed to feature in Mastram, available on MX Player.

Filmography

Films

Television

Web series

References

External links
 
 

1993 births
Living people
Indian television actresses
People from Indore